Andriy Oleksandrovych Khayat (born 3 April 1997), known professionally by his surname Khayat (stylized in all-caps), is a Ukrainian singer.

He finished second place in the Ukrainian musical competition Vidbir 2020, whose winner would represent Ukraine in the Eurovision Song Contest 2020.

Discography

Album
 «Khmil'» (2019)

EP
 «Ultra» (2021)

Singles
 «Devochka» (2018)
 «Ясно» (2018)
 «Ever» (2019)
 «Vesnianka» (2019)
 «Osoka» (2019)
 «Сall for Love» (2020)
 «Говорила» (2020)
 «Темно» (2020)
 «Крок» (2021)

Awards and nominations

References

1997 births
Living people
21st-century Ukrainian male  singers
Ukrainian singer-songwriters
Folktronica musicians
The Voice of Ukraine contestants